The Velasco III Cabinet constituted the 10th and 11th cabinets of the Bolivian Republic. It was formed on 27 March 1839, thirty-three days after José Miguel de Velasco was reinstalled as the 4th president of Bolivia following a coup d'état, succeeding the Santa Cruz Cabinet. It was dissolved on 10 June 1841 upon Velasco's overthrow in another coup d'état and was succeeded by the Cabinet of José Ballivián.

Composition

History 
Upon his assumption to office, Velasco charged all ministerial portfolios to Manuel María Urcullu, minister of the Supreme Court of Justice, as minister general pending the formation of a proper ministerial cabinet. A full council of ministers was appointed on 27 March 1839, 33 days into his mandate, composed of three ministers. The Political Constitution of 1839 expanded the number of ministerial posts to four with the introduction of the Ministry of Public Instruction. At the same time, the new constitution abolished the office of the vice president, a fact which remained the case until 1878.

Two future presidents, José María Linares (1857–1861) and Tomás Frías (1872–1873; 1874–1876) were members of this cabinet. A third, José Ballivián (1841–1847), was appointed but never took office, having rebelled against the government.

Cabinets

Structural changes

References

Notes

Footnotes

Bibliography 

 

1839 establishments in Bolivia
1841 disestablishments in Bolivia
Cabinets of Bolivia
Cabinets established in 1839
Cabinets disestablished in 1841